WJTC (channel 44) is an independent television station licensed to Pensacola, Florida, United States, serving northwest Florida and southwest Alabama. It is owned by Deerfield Media alongside Mobile, Alabama–licensed NBC affiliate WPMI-TV (channel 15); Deerfield maintains a local marketing agreement (LMA) with Sinclair Broadcast Group, owner of Pensacola-licensed ABC affiliate WEAR-TV (channel 3) and Fort Walton Beach–licensed MyNetworkTV affiliate WFGX (channel 35), for the provision of certain services.

WJTC and WPMI-TV share studios on Azalea Road (near I-10) in Mobile; master control and some internal operations are based at the shared facilities of WEAR-TV and WFGX on Mobile Highway (US 90) in unincorporated Escambia County, Florida (with a Pensacola mailing address). WJTC's transmitter is located near Robertsdale, Alabama.

History
WJTC signed on the air on December 24, 1984 as an independent station; the station was founded by its original owners, the Mercury Broadcasting Company. The station—which was branded as "C44"—maintained a general entertainment programming format consisting of old movies, cartoons, westerns, dramas, and a few classic sitcoms.

In 1991, Clear Channel Communications, then-owner of WPMI, entered into a local marketing agreement with WJTC. Mercury Broadcasting retained the license, but Clear Channel owned local rights to programming broadcast on the station. WJTC affiliated with the United Paramount Network (UPN) upon its debut on January 16, 1995. Clear Channel acquired WJTC outright in 2001, creating a duopoly with WPMI.

On January 24, 2006, CBS Corporation and Time Warner announced the shutdown of both UPN and The WB effective that fall. A new "fifth" network—"The CW" (named after its corporate parents), to be jointly owned by both companies, would launch in their place, with a lineup primarily featuring the most popular programs from both networks. On February 22, 2006, News Corporation announced that it would launch a network of its own called MyNetworkTV, which would be operated by Fox Television Stations and its syndication division Twentieth Television. WJTC was passed over for both the CW affiliation (which went to WBPG; channel 55, now WFNA) and that of MyNetworkTV (which went to WFGX), both former WB affiliates (from 2001 to 2006 and from 1995 to 2001, respectively). As a result, WJTC became an independent station once again on September 10, 2006, five days before UPN was to shut down.

On April 20, 2007, Clear Channel entered into an agreement to sell its entire television station group to Providence Equity Partners. On March 15, 2008, WJTC, WPMI and the other Clear Channel television properties were sold to Newport Television, a company created by Providence to run the newly acquired stations.

Newport announced on July 19, 2012, that it would sell five of its stations, including WJTC and WPMI, to the Sinclair Broadcast Group. As Sinclair already owns WEAR-TV and WFGX in the Mobile–Pensacola market, which would violate FCC rules restricting the maximum number of television stations in a single market owned by one company to two, the stations' licenses were instead acquired by Deerfield Media; however, Sinclair began operating both stations through a local marketing agreement. The sale was completed on December 3, 2012. However, due to the stations' distance from Pensacola along with the Florida-Alabama border separating the two cities, the operations of WJTC and WPMI remain separate from those of WEAR-TV and WFGX.

2020 tower accident
On October 20, 2020, one individual was killed while a contracting crew was working on the WJTC television tower. According to Sheriff Hoss Mack, debris fell and hit the workers, killing one of them. The workers had climbed the tower to repair a guy cable as part of an ongoing maintenance project. Expert technical high-rise crews with the Mobile Fire Department, the Foley Fire Department and Escambia County, Florida were called in. The Occupational Safety and Health Administration (OSHA) is investigating the incident.

2021 FCC fine
On July 28, 2021, the FCC issued a Forfeiture Order against Deerfield Media stemming from a lawsuit involving WJTC. The lawsuit, filed by AT&T, alleged that Deerfield Media failed to negotiate for retransmission consent in good faith for WJTC and other Sinclair-managed stations. Deerfield was ordered to pay a fine of $512,228 per station named in the lawsuit, including WJTC.

Programming
Syndicated programming on WJTC includes The Simpsons, Modern Family and Two and a Half Men. WJTC broadcasts local high school football games on Friday nights during the fall season. Playoff games were aired as well, but unlike the regular season, these were tape-delayed because of the Alabama High School Athletic Association's regulations. This playoff coverage ended after the 2016 season.

Newscasts
When WJTC signed on the air in 1984, the station produced a morning news program called Mornin along with the market's first prime time newscast at 9:00 p.m. (predating the launch of WALA's 9:00 p.m. newscast by 14 years). The broadcasts originated from studios in downtown Pensacola. The 9:00 p.m. weeknight newscast was moved to 10:00 p.m. in the hopes of attracting more viewers, while the weekend evening newscast continued to air in the 9:00 p.m. timeslot, supplemented with the syndicated national and international news program Independent Network News. The morning and evening newscasts were discontinued by May 31, 1986. Another attempt at a 9 p.m. newscast on the station was made many years later (after WJTC was sold and its facilities moved to Mobile).

Outside of promotions for WPMI's newscasts and simulcasts of that station's severe weather coverage, WJTC didn't air any news programming. However, on September 23, 2013, WPMI began producing two half-hour evening newscasts on WJTC that air weeknights at 6:30 and 9:00 p.m.; the 9:00 p.m. newscast competes with WALA's longer-established prime time newscast (which comparatively runs for one hour) and ironically, also competes with fellow sister station WFGX's 9:00 p.m. newscast that is produced by WEAR-TV (a half-hour program that debuted one month earlier on August 12, 2013).

WJTC canceled its 6:30 newscast on July 29, 2016, and replaced it with Inside Edition the following Monday. The 9 p.m. newscast was moved to 7 p.m. in June 2018.

Technical information

Subchannels
The station's ATSC 1.0 channels are carried on the multiplexed digital signals of sister stations WEAR-TV and WPMI-TV:

44.2 was silent until March 1, 2022, when it was reactivated with Rewind TV; it was the home of Grit from 2014 until 2021 when it moved to a fourth digital subchannel of WFNA.

Analog-to-digital conversion
WJTC discontinued regular programming on its analog signal, over UHF channel 44, on February 17, 2009, the original target date in which full-power television stations in the United States were to transition from analog to digital broadcasts under federal mandate (which was later pushed back to June 12, 2009). The station's digital signal remained on its pre-transition UHF channel 45. Through the use of PSIP, digital television receivers display the station's virtual channel as its former UHF analog channel 44.

ATSC 3.0

References

External links

"Losing its network affiliation, WJTC-TV creates a new identity" (Press-Register article)

JTC
Independent television stations in the United States
Grit (TV network) affiliates
Rewind TV affiliates
Dabl affiliates
Sinclair Broadcast Group
Television channels and stations established in 1984
1984 establishments in Florida
ATSC 3.0 television stations